Inked in Blood is the ninth studio album by American death metal band Obituary. It was crowdfunded via Kickstarter and then released on October 28, 2014 through Gibtown Music/Relapse Records. It is the first studio album with bassist Terry Butler and lead guitarist Kenny Andrews, making this the first Obituary album not to feature Frank Watkins on bass since 1989's Slowly We Rot. A deluxe edition of the album was also released containing two bonus tracks. It is their first album to appear on the Billboard 200 chart, selling 5,200 copies in its first week and peaking at 75.

Track listing

Personnel
 John Tardy – vocals
 Kenny Andrews – lead guitar
 Trevor Peres – rhythm guitar
 Terry Butler – bass
 Donald Tardy – drums

References

Obituary (band) albums
2014 albums
Relapse Records albums